Goodfare is a hamlet in northern Alberta, Canada within the County of Grande Prairie No. 1.

Established as a post office in April 1919, after the residents petitioned for postal service, the name Goodfair was chosen, being descriptive of the area, the name was changed to the current spelling since there was already a Goodfair post office in Saskatchewan. John Third was the first postmaster. The area was originally known as Kempton. 

The community of Goodfare is a vibrant farming community, as well as home to entrepreneurs, tree planters and artists. The community centre - Goodfare Hall - is a popular venue for wedding receptions, Christmas parties, baby and bridal showers, and other community activities. A ball diamond is found behind the Hall, and a small outdoor skating rink next to it. The rink is iced yearly by a community volunteer, depending on weather. There is also a small changing room for families to lace up skates and put on hockey equipment. Every Thursday night in the summer you will find locals playing Horseshoes behind the hall. 

Across the highway, is the former Goodfare store and Goodfare postal boxes. The former store is now closed and under renovations by a German couple, who bought the run down property in 2007. The store was more useful to Goodfare residents when getting to the nearest town (Beaverlodge) was more difficult in the old days, but now the new paved highway makes it more accessible. 

Goodfare originally ran a one-room school near the hall. Currently, families in Goodfare send their children to elementary school (grade 1–6) in Beaverlodge. For junior high and senior high, students go to Hythe and Beaverlodge respectively. 

Residents of this rural area refer to themselves as "Goodfarians" with a grain of humour. 

Goodfare meats can be bought at the Edmonton Farmer's market from First Nature Farms.

Demographics 
Goodfare recorded a population of 11 in the 1986 Census of Population conducted by Statistics Canada.

See also 
List of communities in Alberta
List of hamlets in Alberta

References 

 "Place Names of Alberta", online source, http://www.albertasource.ca/placenames/resources/displaycontent.php?source_id=10084"

County of Grande Prairie No. 1
Hamlets in Alberta